Chattayum Mundum is a traditional attire used by the Syrian Christian women of Kerala. It is a seamless white garment, consisting of a white blouse covering the whole upper part of the body ("Chatta") and a long white garment called "Mundu" which is wrapped around the waist which reaches to the ankles. The "Chatta" is of Jewish origin and the "Mundu" is of South Indian origin. The Mundu used is 9.5 yards long. The "Chatta" or the Blouse would either be full sleeve which covers the whole arm or would be near to the elbow. A fan like appendage is also made in the backside by  pleating the garment. A creamish white cloth with a golden border known as the "Kavani" or "Neriyathu" is worn over the left shoulder and  tucked into the Mundu when the women are outside the house. Traditionally in the church the women cover themselves with another white cloth with a golden border "Kasavu" which is worn over the head covering the head and the shoulders. It is now limited to the older female adherents and the Margamkali performers. The traditional Syrian Christian dance Margamkali is performed by wearing a slightly shorter variant of the Chattayum Mundum.

See also 

 Saint Thomas Christians
 Margamkali
 Mundu

References

Bibliography
 

Dresses
Indian clothing